Kyunsu or Kanmaw Township is a township of Myeik District in the Taninthayi Division of Myanmar. The principal town is Kyunsu (older name Kanmaw). The township constitutes much of the Mergui Archipelago to the west, northwest and southwest of the city of Mergui (Myeik). The main town is located on the north-east coast of Kanmaw Island to the southwest of Mergui city.

History
Kyunsu Township was created out of Mergui Township in 1990, the remainder of which became Myeik Township.

References

External links
Map of Kyunsu Township

Townships of Taninthayi Region